Rakesh Kumar is an Indian politician and a member of the 16th Legislative Assembly of India. He represents the Chharra constituency of Uttar Pradesh and is a member of the Samajwadi Party political party.

Early life and  education
Rakesh Kumar was  born in Aligarh district. He attended the Shivaji University and attained Bachelor of Engineering degree.

Political career
Rakesh Kumar has been a MLA for one term. He represented the Chharra constituency and is a member of the Samajwadi Party political party.

Posts held

See also
 Chharra (Assembly constituency)
 Sixteenth Legislative Assembly of Uttar Pradesh
 Uttar Pradesh Legislative Assembly

References 

Samajwadi Party politicians
Uttar Pradesh MLAs 2012–2017
Shivaji University alumni
People from Aligarh district
1973 births
Living people